Carla Rochín Nieto (born 4 July 1966) is a Mexican politician affiliated with the National Action Party. As of 2014 she served as Deputy of the LIX Legislature of the Mexican Congress representing Guanajuato.

References

1966 births
Living people
Politicians from Guanajuato
Women members of the Chamber of Deputies (Mexico)
National Action Party (Mexico) politicians
Universidad de Guanajuato alumni
21st-century Mexican politicians
21st-century Mexican women politicians
Deputies of the LIX Legislature of Mexico
Members of the Chamber of Deputies (Mexico) for Guanajuato